This is a list of publicly available Content-based image retrieval (CBIR)  engines. These image search engines look at the content (pixels) of images in order to return results that match a particular query.

Commercial CBIR search engines

CBIR research projects/demos/open source projects

Image search
CBIR engines